East Liberty is a coming-of-age novel by the American writer Joseph Bathanti.

Set in the 1950s and 1960s in the Pittsburgh, Pennsylvania, Italian-American neighborhood of East Liberty, it tells the story of Bobby Renzo, who is raised by his unwed mother and who feels called to the Roman Catholic priesthood.

See also

Everyday People (novel)

References

2001 American novels
Italian-American culture in Pittsburgh
Italian-American novels
Novels set in Pittsburgh
Fiction set in the 1950s
Fiction set in the 1960s
American bildungsromans
Catholic novels
2001 debut novels